The 2008 Korean FA Cup, known as the 2008 Hana Bank FA Cup, was the 13th edition of the Korean FA Cup. It began on 24 February 2008, and ended on 21 December 2008. Pohang Steelers claimed their second title after beating Gyeongnam FC 2–0 in the final.

Qualifying rounds

First round

Second round

Third round

Final rounds

Bracket

Fourth round
Jeonnam Dragons and Pohang Steelers won by default.

Round of 16

Quarter-finals

Semi-finals

Final

Awards
Source:

See also
2008 in South Korean football
2008 K League
2008 Korea National League
2008 K3 League
2008 U-League
2008 Korean League Cup

References

External links
Official website
Fixtures & Results at KFA

 

2008
2008 in South Korean football
2008 domestic association football cups